Lalit Tiwari is an Indian film and television actor. His best-known television roles are that of Sanjaya in the series Mahabharat (1988–1990), and the one in the historical television series Bharat Ek Khoj - The Discovery of India (1988).

An alumnus of the National School of Drama, he made his debut in films with Sudhir Mishra's Yeh Woh Manzil To Nahin (1987). Next was the postmodernist film, Om-Dar-B-Dar (1988), which became a cult classic. He has acted in numerous parallel cinema films with director Shyam Benegal, such as Suraj Ka Satvan Ghoda, Mammo, Hari-Bhari, Netaji Subhas Chandra Bose: The Forgotten Hero, Welcome to Sajjanpur and Well Done Abba!. He has also acted in mainstream Bollywood films such as Chandni, Lamhe and Dilwale Dulhania Le Jayenge.

Filmography

Television

References

External links
 
 

Indian male film actors
Living people
Male actors in Hindi cinema
Indian male television actors
National School of Drama alumni
21st-century Indian male actors
Year of birth missing (living people)
Place of birth missing (living people)
20th-century Indian male actors
Male actors in Hindi television